Fort Covington is a census-designated place (CDP) within the town of Fort Covington, Franklin County, New York, United States. It consists of the hamlet of Fort Covington, as well as a large amount of rural land surrounding the hamlet, such that the CDP occupies about one half of the area within the town limits. The population of the CDP was 1,308 at the 2010 census, out of a total town population of 1,676.

Geography
The Fort Covington CDP occupies the northern half of the town of Fort Covington, with the actual hamlet situated in the northern part of the CDP, along the Salmon River, just south of the Canada–United States border.

New York State Route 37 runs east to west across the CDP, leading southeast  to Malone, the Franklin County seat, and west  to Massena.

The northern border of the CDP, which follows the town line, is the international border with Canada. The Fort Covington–Dundee Border Crossing connects Dundee Road, leading south into the center of Fort Covington, with Quebec Route 132, which leads northeast along the south shore of the St. Lawrence River,  to Salaberry-de-Valleyfield.

Demographics

References

Census-designated places in New York (state)
Census-designated places in Franklin County, New York